Pontault-Combault Handball, previously known as UMS Pontault-Combault HB is a French handball team based in Pontault-Combault in the suburbs of Paris and founded in 1967. Since 1992, the club has alternated between the French Division 2 and Division 1 championships, which it found for only one season in 2018–2019.

History

Born in 1967, the Etoile Sportive de Pontault-Combault took off through the Regional Championship. Having become Union municipale sports de Pontault-Combault Handball Club and then trained by Thierry Anti, the club won the French championship in the 3rd division in 1992 and then in the 2nd division in 1994. The club then evolves for 7 seasons in the elite with the culmination of a fourth place in 1999 before being relegated in 2001. The club then oscillates several seasons between D1 and D2 before being permanently relegated in 2008. In 2018, the club, now called Pontault-Combault Handball, won the Division 2 Accession Barrages: author of 4 draws in as many games, the club was thus promoted to Division 1 without having won a match.

Crest, colours, supporters

Naming history

Kits

Team

Current squad 

Squad for the 2021–22 season

Technical staff
 Head coach:  Chérif Hamani
 Assistant coach:  Didier Ruffe
 Goalkeeping coach:  Damien Pellier
 Fitness coach:  Mario Danial
 Physiotherapist:  Ludivine Misselyn
 Physiotherapist:  Julie Mandelli
 Club doctor:  Patrick Sportouch

Former club members

Notable former players

 Johan Boisedu (2000–2001)
 Robin Cantegrel (2017–2019)
 Francis Franck (1995–1996)
 Thibaut Karsenty (2002–2006)
 Frédéric Louis (1992–1995)
 Mohamadi Loutoufi (2001–2005)
 Stéphane Moualek (2003–2004)
 Alix Kévynn Nyokas (2004–2006)
 Olivier Nyokas (2004–2006)
 Thierry Perreux (1996–1998)
 Yérime Sylla (2001–2004)
 Walid Badi (2021–)
 Hichem Kaabeche (2018–2019)
 Gonzalo Carró (2019–2020)
 Luka Sokolić (2016–2020)
 Aurélien Tchitombi (2013–2018)
 Gonçalo Ribeiro (2017-2018)
 Ion Mocanu (1995–2002)
 Cristian Zaharia (1993–1996)
 Dragan Mladenović (2004–2006)

Former coaches

References

External links
 
 

French handball clubs
1968 establishments in France
Handball clubs established in 1968
Sport in Seine-et-Marne